Leonard Bailey (May 8, 1825 in Hollis, New Hampshire – February 5, 1905 in New York City) was a toolmaker/cabinet maker from Massachusetts, United States, who in the mid-to-late nineteenth century patented several features of woodworking equipment.  Most prominent of those patents were the planes manufactured by the Stanley Rule & Level Co. (now Stanley Black & Decker) of New Britain, Connecticut.

Commonly known as Stanley/Bailey planes, these planes were prized by woodworkers of the late 19th and early 20th centuries, and remain popular among today's wood craftsman.  A type study of his patented planes and the rest of the Stanley line may be found at Patrick Leach's "Blood and Gore".

Bailey's design ideas are still utilized by Stanley and other plane manufacturers to this day.

References

1825 births
1905 deaths
People from Hollis, New Hampshire
19th-century American inventors
Inventors from New Hampshire